François Cornut-Gentille (born 22 May 1958 in Saint-Mandé, Val-de-Marne) is a French politician of the Republicans who has been serving as a member of the National Assembly of France since 1993, representing the Haute-Marne department.

Political career
In parliament, Cornut-Gentille serves on the Finance Committee. Since the 2017 elections, he has been serving as one of the eleven deputy chairpersons of the Republicans' parliamentary group, under the leadership of chairman Christian Jacob.

His uncle was the administrator and politician Bernard Cornut-Gentille.

Political positions
In the Republicans’ 2016 presidential primaries, Cornut-Gentille endorsed Alain Juppé as the party's candidate for the office of President of France. In the Republicans’ 2017 leadership election, he endorsed Laurent Wauquiez. Ahead of the 2022 presidential elections, he publicly declared his support for Michel Barnier as the Republicans’ candidate. Ahead of the 2022 presidential elections, he publicly declared his support for Michel Barnier as the Republicans’ candidate.

References

1958 births
Living people
People from Saint-Mandé
Rally for the Republic politicians
Union for a Popular Movement politicians
The Republicans (France) politicians
Mayors of places in Grand Est
Politicians from Grand Est
Deputies of the 12th National Assembly of the French Fifth Republic
Deputies of the 13th National Assembly of the French Fifth Republic
Deputies of the 14th National Assembly of the French Fifth Republic
Deputies of the 15th National Assembly of the French Fifth Republic
Members of Parliament for Haute-Marne